Mukuru is the Supreme Creator (God) of the Himba and Herero people of Namibia. The deceased ancestors of the Himba and Herero are subservient to him, acting as intermediaries. However, while the ancestors are believed to bless or curse, Mukuru is believed to only bless.

References

Creator gods
African gods
Religion in Namibia
Names of God in African traditional religions